The 2005–06 A1 Grand Prix of Nations, Indonesia is an A1 Grand Prix race which was held on the weekend of February 12, 2006 at the Sentul International Circuit.

Report

Postponement
The 2005–06 A1 Grand Prix of Nations, Indonesia was originally scheduled to be held on January 15, 2006. This changed on January 4, 2006 however, due to the unexpected death of Sheikh Maktoum bin Rashid Al Maktoum, the Emir of Dubai and the uncle of A1 Grand Prix launcher Maktoum Hasher Maktoum Al Maktoum the day before. This postponement was prompted due to the traditional forty-day mourning period. Tony Teixeira, CEO of A1 Grand Prix stated:

"The entire staff, team owners and associates of the A1 Grand Prix family mourn the loss of a great visionary and benevolent ruler of Dubai, His Highness Sheikh bin Rashid Al Maktoum. While difficult logistically, we felt it important to observe a respectable period of mourning for this beloved family member of our founder, president and chairman, Sheikh Maktoum. Condolences and sympathies are respectfully offered to all the people of Dubai." 

On the following day, the A1 Grand Prix and the Indonesian race organizers agreed to run the race on February 12, changing its order in the schedule from that of the seventh to the eighth race of the eleven-race season.

Results

Qualifying
Qualifying took place on Saturday, February 11, 2006.

Sprint race
The sprint race took place on Sunday, February 12, 2006.

Main race
The main race took place on Sunday, February 12, 2006.

References

Race Report

Indonesia
A1 Grand Prix
Auto races in Indonesia